A partial solar eclipse will occur on Sunday, August 2, 2065. A solar eclipse occurs when the Moon passes between Earth and the Sun, thereby totally or partly obscuring the image of the Sun for a viewer on Earth. A partial solar eclipse occurs in the polar regions of the Earth when the center of the Moon's shadow misses the Earth.

Related eclipses

Solar eclipses 2062–2065

Metonic series

References

External links 
 http://eclipse.gsfc.nasa.gov/SEplot/SEplot2051/SE2065Aug02P.GIF

2065 in science
2065 8 2
2065 8 2